The Journal of Policy Modeling is a peer-reviewed academic journal that covers research in economics and  policy. The journal was established in 1979 and is published by Elsevier for the Society for Policy Modeling. It publishes academic research papers analyzing national and international policy issues. The Journal of Policy Modeling is ranked by the CNRS, the ESSEC Business School, and SCIMago, among others.

According to the Journal Citation Reports, the journal has a 2018 impact factor of 1.2.

References

External links
 

Elsevier academic journals

Economics journals
Publications established in 1979
English-language journals